San Nicolas, officially the Municipality of San Nicolas, is a 1st class municipality in the province of Pangasinan, Philippines. According to the 2020 census, it has a population of 39,778 people.

Soon the completion building and concreting of the Villa Verde Road will be a short cut to go to Santa Fe, Nueva Vizcaya and easier access to the upland barangays of Malico and Fianza.

Geography
San Nicolas is located in north-eastern part of Pangasinan. It is the only town that borders Nueva Vizcaya.

Barangays
San Nicolas is politically subdivided into barangays. These barangays are headed by elected officials: Barangay Captain, Barangay Council, whose members are called Barangay Councilors. All are elected every three years.

San Nicolas currently has a boundary dispute with Santa Fe, Nueva Vizcaya, in which Santa Fe claims the territory of barangay Malico. The Nueva Ecija provincial board passed a resolution on September 21, 2022, urging San Nicolas officials to respect a memorandum of agreement between the National Mapping and Resource Information Authority (NAMRIA), Pangasinan, and Nueva Vizcaya about twenty years ago. On the same day, the Nueva Vizcaya provincial board held a special session in Barangay Malico and issued a resolution requesting San Nicolas officials to refrain from building infrastructure projects within the barangay's boundaries. Said resolution also instructed San Nicolas officials to "respect the boundary" of Santa Fe as well as "the rights of the Kalanguya tribe and their ancestral domain rights." Both municipalities in both provinces claim to have a barangay named Malico.

Climate

Demographics

Economy

Government
San Nicolas, belonging to the sixth congressional district of the province of Pangasinan, is governed by a mayor designated as its local chief executive and by a municipal council as its legislative body in accordance with the Local Government Code. The mayor, vice mayor, and the councilors are elected directly by the people through an election which is being held every three years.

Elected officials

Tourism

San Nicolas is a place with many waterfalls from the Caraballo Mountain Range and a number of rivers that serve as a picnic ground for vacationers during holidays and summertime.

Lipit falls are located in Barangay Santa Maria East. It is an hour trail from the Red Arrow Monument along Cabalitian River. Best time to visit the place is during the summertime but it is also safe to go there during rainy seasons.

Agpay falls is in Barangay San Felipe East. During the 1970s up to the 1980s it was actually one of the best natural tourist spots in eastern Pangasinan.

Other waterfalls of interest include: Pinsal falls 1, 2 and 3, located in Sitio Nagsimbaoaan in Barangay Cacabugaoan; Mambolo falls, located at Barangay Salpad and Pinsal Bensican in brgy. Bensican; and Baracbac falls are located in Barangay Fianza just north of Sitio Puyao.

Mejias Resort is located at town proper of San Nicolas. It has a wide space for picnic area and reception hall for kinds of parties and events. They are accepting decorating services and catering for a variety of special events, including the concept and design, planning, day of coordination, and much more. They have also swimming pools for adults and children.

Krystala de Corazon is located at Barangay Calaocan, San Nicolas.

Esperanza's Garden is located at Barangay Cabitnongan, San Nicolas.

Cabalisian River - crystal clear water located at Barangay Santa Maria.

References

External links

 San Nicolas Profile at PhilAtlas.com
 
  Municipal Profile at the National Competitiveness Council of the Philippines
 San Nicolas at the Pangasinan Government Website
 Local Governance Performance Management System
 [ Philippine Standard Geographic Code]
 Philippine Census Information

Municipalities of Pangasinan
Populated places on the Agno River